Edwin Godwin Reade (November 13, 1812 – October 18, 1894) was a U.S. congressman from North Carolina between 1855 and 1857. He later served in the Confederate Senate during the American Civil War.

Biography
Edwin Reade was born in Person County, North Carolina in 1812; a lawyer, he was admitted to the bar in 1835 and practiced in Roxboro.

Reade served a single term in the 34th United States Congress as a member of the American Party (March 4, 1855 – March 3, 1857), and refused to run for re-election in 1856. In 1863, Governor Zebulon Vance appointed Reade to the Confederate Senate to fill the seat of George Davis, who had resigned to become the Confederacy's Attorney General.

Following the Civil War, Reade presided over the Reconstruction convention in 1865 in Raleigh, North Carolina. In 1868, he was named as associate justice of the North Carolina Supreme Court, a post he held until 1879. Following his retirement from government, Reade engaged in banking in Raleigh, where he died in 1894. He is buried in Raleigh's Oakwood Cemetery.

External links

|-

1812 births
1894 deaths
People from Person County, North Carolina
Know-Nothing members of the United States House of Representatives from North Carolina
Confederate States of America senators
Justices of the North Carolina Supreme Court
People of North Carolina in the American Civil War
Burials at Historic Oakwood Cemetery
19th-century American politicians
People from Roxboro, North Carolina